Z11 Bernd von Arnim was a  built for Nazi Germany's Kriegsmarine in the late 1930s. At the beginning of World War II, the ship was initially deployed to blockade the Polish coast, but she was quickly transferred to the German Bight to lay minefields in German waters. In late 1939 the ship made one successful minelaying sortie off the English coast that claimed one British warship and seven merchant ships. During the early stages of the Norwegian Campaign, Bernd von Arnim fought the British destroyer  while transporting troops to the Narvik area in early April 1940, but neither ship was damaged during the action. The ship fought in both naval Battles of Narvik several days later and had to be scuttled after she exhausted her ammunition.

Design and description
Steam was provided to the turbines by six high-pressure Benson boilers with superheaters.

Bernd von Arnim carried five 12.7 cm SK C/34 guns in single mounts with gun shields, two each superimposed, fore and aft. The fifth gun was carried on top of the rear deckhouse. Her anti-aircraft armament consisted of four 3.7 cm SK C/30 guns in two twin mounts abreast the rear funnel and six 2 cm C/30 guns in single mounts. The ship carried eight above-water  torpedo tubes in two power-operated mounts. A pair of reload torpedoes were provided for each mount. Four depth charge throwers were mounted on the sides of the rear deckhouse and they were supplemented by six racks for individual depth charges on the sides of the stern. Enough depth charges were carried for either two or four patterns of 16 charges each. Mine rails could be fitted on the rear deck that had a maximum capacity of 60 mines. 'GHG' (Gruppenhorchgerät) passive hydrophones were fitted to detect submarines.

Career
The ship was ordered on 4 August 1934 and laid down at Germania, Kiel on 26 March 1935 as yard number G537. She was launched on 8 July 1936 and completed on 6 July 1938. When World War II began in September 1939, Bernd von Arnim was initially deployed in the Baltic to operate against the Polish Navy and to enforce a blockade of Poland, but she was soon transferred to the German Bight where she joined her sisters in laying defensive minefields. The ship also patrolled the Skagerrak to inspect neutral shipping for contraband goods. Bernd von Arnim joined the other destroyers in laying minefields off the British coast in November, when Bernd von Arnim, Hermann Künne and Wilhelm Heidkamp laid about 180 magnetic mines in the middle of the Thames Estuary on the night of 17/18 November. The destroyer , one trawler, and seven other ships totalling 27,565 Gross Register Tons (GRT) were sunk by this minefield. Four days later, she was one of the destroyers escorting the battleships  and  through the North Sea to break out into the North Atlantic. Together with her sisters Hans Lody and Erich Giese, Bernd von Arnim was to lay a minefield off Cromer during the night of 6/7 December, but she had trouble with two of her boilers and had to shut them down. The ship was ordered to return to port while the other two destroyers continued their mission.

Norwegian campaign

Bernd von Arnim was allocated to Group 1 for the Norwegian portion of Operation Weserübung in April 1940. The group's task was to transport the 139th Mountain Infantry Regiment (139. Gebirgsjäger Regiment) and the headquarters of the 3rd Mountain Division (3. Gebirgs-Division) to seize Narvik. The ships began loading troops on 6 April and set sail the next day. Bernd von Arnim was spotted by the British destroyer  in a storm on the morning of 8 April and the ship turned away to the north-west at full speed after laying a smoke screen. The British destroyer was better suited for the conditions and began to close on Bernd von Arnim. Lieutenant Commander (Korvettenkapitän) Curt Rechel, captain of von Arnim, turned his ship to the north-east, closer to the heavy cruiser . The ships exchanged fire without effect for an hour until Hipper came within range and sank Glowworm shortly afterward.

The German destroyers reached the Ofotfjord on the morning of 9 April and Commodore Friedrich Bonte took his flagship Wilhelm Heidkamp, Bernd von Arnim and Georg Thiele down the fjord to Narvik. A heavy snowstorm allowed von Arnim and Thiele to enter the harbor without challenge and tie up at a pier. The mountain troops immediately began disembarking, but the ship was spotted by the coast defense ship  a few minutes later. The latter ship immediately opened fire and was able to fire approximately 13 shells at  range before von Arnim was able to fire seven torpedoes. Only two struck the Norwegian ship, but they detonated one or more of the ship's magazines and she immediately capsized and sank. None of the Norwegian shells hit either of the two German destroyers due to the darkness and falling snow, despite the short range. Von Arnim lowered boats to rescue the surviving Norwegian sailors and was able to pick up 96 men together with boats from the merchantmen in harbor.

Von Arnim and Thiele were the first to refuel from the single tanker that had made it safely to Narvik and later moved to the Ballangenfjord, a southern arm of the Ofotfjord, closer to the entrance. Shortly before dawn on 10 April, the five destroyers of the British 2nd Destroyer Flotilla surprised the five German destroyers in Narvik harbor. They torpedoed two destroyers and badly damaged the other three while suffering only minor damage themselves. As they were beginning to withdraw they encountered the three destroyers of the 4th Flotilla which had been alerted in the Herjansfjord when the British began their attack. The Germans opened fire first, but the gunnery for both sides was not effective due to the mist and the smoke screen laid by the British as they retreated down the Ofotfjord. The German ships had to turn away to avoid a salvo of three torpedoes fired by one of the destroyers in Narvik, but von Arnim and Thiele had also been alerted and were coming up to engage the British.

The two German destroyers crossed the T of the British flotilla and were able to fire full broadsides at a range of only . They first engaged the British flagship, and badly damaged her. Both of her forward guns were knocked out and the forward superstructure was set afire. Their fire was relatively ineffective and both sides fired torpedoes without scoring any hits. Havock pulled out and dropped to the rear to fight off any pursuit by the ships of the 4th Flotilla. This placed  in the lead and she was quickly set on fire by the German ships. Thiele probably also hit her with a torpedo and she was rammed from behind by  when the latter ship lost steering control. Hotspur was able to disengage, but Hunter capsized shortly afterward. The three remaining British ships were able to escape from the Germans under the cover of a smoke screen. Von Arnim had been hit by five British shells, which had knocked out one boiler. This was repaired by the morning of 13 April and she received six torpedoes from the badly damaged destroyers.

On the night of 12 April, Commander Erich Bey, the senior surviving German officer, received word to expect an attack the following day by British capital ships escorted by a large number of destroyers and supported by carrier aircraft. The battleship  and nine destroyers duly appeared on 13 April, although earlier than Commander Bey had expected, and caught the Germans out of position. The five operable destroyers, including Bernd von Arnim, charged out of Narvik harbor and engaged the British ships. Although no hits were scored, they did inflict splinter damage on several of the destroyers. The ship was able to make a torpedo attack on the British destroyers before being driven off, but her torpedoes all missed. Lack of ammunition forced the German ships to retreat to the Rombaksfjorden (the easternmost branch of the Ofotfjord), east of Narvik, where they might attempt to ambush pursuing British destroyers. Von Arnim had exhausted her ammunition and she was beached at the head of the fjord. Her crew placed demolition charges and abandoned the ship. By the time the British reached the ship she had rolled over onto her side. The ship's crew joined the German troops ashore and participated in the campaign until the British evacuated the area in June.

Notes

References

External links
 Kriegsmarine destroyers

1936 ships
Ships built in Kiel
Type 1934 destroyers
Maritime incidents in April 1940
World War II shipwrecks in the Norwegian Sea
Scuttled vessels of Germany